Cave Valley is a valley in the U.S. state of Nevada.

Cave Valley was so named for the caves the valley contains.

References

Valleys of Lincoln County, Nevada
Valleys of White Pine County, Nevada